Maria Ekstrand (born 2 March 1970) is a Swedish former professional tennis player.

Ekstrand, who reached a best singles ranking of 149, claimed two $25,000 ITF titles during her career, in Benin City in 1988 and York, Pennsylvania in 1990. Most notably, Ekstrand won through to the second round of the 1991 Australian Open, where she was eliminated by fourth seed Gabriela Sabatini.

ITF finals

Singles: 5 (3–2)

Doubles: 8 (1–7)

References

External links
 
 

1970 births
Living people
Swedish female tennis players
20th-century Swedish women
21st-century Swedish women